Sala Daeng station is a BTS Skytrain station, on the Silom line in Bang Rak District, Bangkok, Thailand. The station is located on Si Lom Road to the southwest of Sala Daeng Intersection. It is surrounded by financial center along Si Lom Road with towers and skyscrapers, and also entertainment area of Patpong and Thaniya.

Facilities
 Sky Walk to Si Lom station (MRT Blue Line), Sala Dang Intersection and King Chulalongkorn Memorial Hospital

See also
 BTS Skytrain

References

BTS Skytrain stations